is a Japanese animation studio founded in 1975 by Sunrise producer Hiroshi Hasegawa and ex-Sunrise animators. The studio owns three subsidiaries: Danny Donghua (丹尼動画), a Chinese sub-contracting studio; Megumi (め組), a digital work sub-contracting studio; and Umidori (うみどり), a 3DCG sub-contracting studio. Studio Deen has been operating as a subsidiary of IMA Group since 2011.

Television series

1984–2000
 Urusei Yatsura (1984–1986, #107–195)
Pro Golfer Saru (1985–88, co-produced with Shin-Ei Animation)
 Maison Ikkoku (1986–1988)
 F (1988)
 Ranma ½ (1989)
 Ranma ½ Nettōhen (1989–1992)
 DNA² (1994, with Madhouse)
 Zenki (1995)
 You're Under Arrest (1996–1997)
 Violinist of Hameln (1996–1997)
 Rurouni Kenshin (1997–1998, #67–95)
 Eat-Man (1997)
 Haunted Junction (1997)
 Next Senki Ehrgeiz (1997)
 Don't Leave Me Alone, Daisy (1997)
 AWOL -Absent Without Leave- (1998)
 Eat-Man '98 (1998)
 Super Radical Gag Family (1998)
 Shadow Skill - Eigi (1998)
 Momoiro Sisters (1998)
 Eden's Bowy (1999)
 Houshin Engi (1999)
 Itsumo Kokoro ni Taiyō o! (1999)
 Let's Dance With Papa (1999)
 You're Under Arrest (1999)
 Mon Colle Knights (2000)
 Gravitation (2000–2001)

2001–2010
 You're Under Arrest (2001, 2nd season)
 Star Ocean EX (2001)
 Fruits Basket (2001, 1st anime)
 Kokoro Library (2001)
 Sadamitsu the Destroyer (2001)
 Rave Master (2001–2002)
 Samurai Deeper Kyo (2002)
 Bomberman Jetters (2002–2003)
 Full Moon o Sagashite (2002–2003)
 GetBackers (2002–2003)
 Jing: King of Bandits (2002)
 The Mythical Detective Loki Ragnarok (2003)
 Mouse (2003)
 Yami to Bōshi to Hon no Tabibito (2003)
 R.O.D the TV (2003–2004)
 Diamond Daydreams (2004)
 Maria-sama ga Miteru (2004)
 Maria-sama ga Miteru: Printemps (2004)
 Yumeria (2004)
 Get Ride! AMDriver (2004–2005)
 Tactics (2004–2005)
 Zipang (2004–2005)
 Kyo Kara Maoh! (2004–2006)
 Amaenaide yo!! (2005)
 Ginga Densetsu Weed (2005–2006)
 Hell Girl (2005–2006)
 The Law of Ueki (2005–2006)
 Amaenaide yo!! Katsu!! (2006)
 Binchō-tan (2006)
 Fate/stay night (2006)
 Higurashi no Naku Koro ni (2006)
 Hell Girl: Two Mirrors (2006–2007)
 Princess Princess (2006)
 Simoun (2006)
 Shōnen Onmyōji (2006–2007)
 Higurashi no Naku Koro ni Kai (2007)
 Shining Tears X Wind (2007)
 Tōka Gettan (2007)
 You're Under Arrest: Full Throttle (2007–2008)
 Code-E (2007)
 Shion no Ō (2007–2008)
 Fantastic Detective Labyrinth (2007–2008)
 Gag Manga Biyori 3 (2008)
 Mission-E (2008)
 Amatsuki (2008)
 Hatenkō Yūgi (2008)
 Junjo Romantica (2008)
 Vampire Knight (2008)
 Hell Girl: Three Vessels (2008–2009)
 Junjo Romantica 2 (2008)
 Vampire Knight Guilty (2008)
 Kyo Kara Maoh! Third Series (2008–2009)
 Maria-sama ga Miteru (2009)
 Cookin' Idol Ai! Mai! Main! (2009)
 07-Ghost (2009)
 Student Council's Discretion (2009)
 Umineko no Naku Koro ni (2009)
 Gag Manga Biyori + (2010)
 Giant Killing (2010)
 Hakuoki: Demon of the Fleeting Blossom (2010)
 Nura: Rise of the Yokai Clan (2010)
 Hakuoki: Record of the Jade Blood (2010)
 Starry Sky (2010–2011)

2011–2020
 Dragon Crisis! (2011)
 Is This a Zombie? (2011)
 Sekai-ichi Hatsukoi (2011)
 Nura: Rise of the Yokai Clan: Demon Capital (2011)
 Sekai-ichi Hatsukoi 2 (2011)
 Poyopoyo Kansatsu Nikki (2012)
 Hakuoki: Dawn of the Shinsengumi (2012)
 Hiiro no Kakera: The Tamayori Princess Saga (2012)
 Is This a Zombie? of the Dead (2012)
 Sankarea: Undying Love (2012)
 Hiiro no Kakera: The Tamayori Princess Saga 2 (2012)
 Hakkenden: Tōhō Hakken Ibun (2013)
 Rozen Maiden: Zurückspulen (2013)
 Gifu Dodo!! Kanetsugu to Keiji (2013)
 Meganebu! (2013)
 Pupa (2014)
 Sakura Trick (2014)
 Meshimase Lodoss-tō Senki: Sorette Oishii no? (2014)
 Always! Super Radical Gag Family (2014)
 Samurai Jam -Bakumatsu Rock- (2014)
 Log Horizon 2 (2014–2015)
 Jewelpet: Magical Change (2015)
 Junjo Romantica 3 (2015)
 Descending Stories: Showa Genroku Rakugo Shinju (2016–2017)
 Reikenzan: Hoshikuzu-tachi no Utage (2016)
 KonoSuba (2016–2017)
 Rilu Rilu Fairilu ~Yousei no Door~ (2016–2017)
 Super Lovers (2016–2017)
 Haven't You Heard? I'm Sakamoto (2016)
 Tonkatsu DJ Agetarō (2016)
 First Love Monster (2016)
 Ao Oni: The Animation (2016–2017)
 Reikenzan: Eichi e no Shikaku (2017)
 Kabukibu! (2017)
 Rilu Rilu Fairilu ~Maho no Kagami~ (2017–2018)
 Hell Girl: The Fourth Twilight (2017)
 The Reflection (2017)
 Hozuki's Coolheadedness 2 (2017–2018)
 Junji Ito Collection (2018)
 Gurazeni (2018)
 Ongaku Shōjo (2018)
 Oshiete Mahou no Pendulum ~Rilu Rilu Fairilu~ (2018–2019)
 Agū: Tensai Ningyō (2018)
 Muhyo & Roji's Bureau of Supernatural Investigation (2018–2020)
 Xuan Yuan Sword Luminary (2018)
 Bakumatsu (2018–2019)
 Kochoki: Wakaki Nobunaga (2019)
 Outburst Dreamer Boys (2019)
 The Seven Deadly Sins: Wrath of the Gods (2019–2020) 
 Sorcerous Stabber Orphen (2020)

2021–present 
 Log Horizon: Destruction of the Round Table (2021)
 The Seven Deadly Sins: Dragon's Judgement (2021)
 Sorcerous Stabber Orphen: Battle of Kimluck (2021)
 Sasaki and Miyano (2022)
 Sorcerous Stabber Orphen: Chaos in Urbanrama (2023)

OVA/ONAs
 Urusei Yatsura (1985–1987, #1–3)
 Making of Urusei Yatsura 4: Lum the Forever (1986)
 Mystery Article File 538 (1987)
 The Samurai (1987)
 Patlabor: Early Days (1988–1989)
 Eiyuu Gaiden Mozaicka (1991)
 Domain of Murder (1992)
 Ranma ½ (1993–1994)
 You're Under Arrest (1994–1995)
 The Irresponsible Captain Tylor (1994–1996, episodes 3–10)
 Ranma ½ Special (1994–1995)
 DNA² (1995, with Madhouse)
 Shadow Skill (1995)
 Ranma ½ Super (1995–1996)
 Shounen Santa no Bouken (1996)
 Kishin Dōji Zenki Gaiden: Anki Kitan (1997)
 Tekken: The Motion Picture (1998)
 Super Mobile Legend Dinagiga (1998)
 Rurouni Kenshin: Trust & Betrayal (1999)
 Phantom Hunter Miko (2000–2001, with Shinkūkan)
 Rurouni Kenshin: Reflection (2001)
 Read or Die (2001)
 You're Under Arrest (2002)
 Jing: King of Bandits: Seventh Heaven (2004)
 Maria-sama ni wa Naisho (2004–2009)
 Maria-sama ga Miteru (2006–2007)
 Kyo Kara Maoh! R (2007–2008)
 Ranma ½: Nightmare! Incense of Spring Sleep (2008)
 Higurashi no Naku Koro ni Rei (2009)
 Hetalia: Axis Powers (2009–2010)
 Hetalia: World Series (2010–2011)
 Rurouni Kenshin: New Kyoto Arc (2011–2012)
 Higurashi no Naku Koro ni Kira (2011–2012)
 Hakuoki: A Memory of Snow Flowers (2011–2012)
 Sekai-ichi Hatsukoi: No love's like to the first. (2011)
 Sekai-ichi Hatsukoi: Hatori Yoshiyuki no Baai (2011)
 Junjo Romantica (2012)
 Hetalia: The Beautiful World (2013)
 Higurashi no Naku Koro ni Kaku: Outbreak (2013)
 Hybrid Child (2014–2015)
 Descending Stories: Showa Genroku Rakugo Shinju (2015)
 Hetalia: The World Twinkle (2015)
 Haven't You Heard? I'm Sakamoto (2016)
 Hozuki's Coolheadedness (2017)
 Neo Yokio (2017, with Production I.G and Moi Animation)
 Rick and Morty (2020 special "Samurai & Shogun")
 Sorcerous Stabber Orphen (2020)
 Hetalia: World Stars (2021)
 Hakuoki (2021–2022)
 Sasaki and Miyano (2022)
 Junji Ito Maniac: Japanese Tales of the Macabre (2023)

Films
 Urusei Yatsura 3: Remember My Love (1985)
 Angel's Egg (1985)
 Urusei Yatsura 4: Lum the Forever (1986)
 Patlabor: The Movie (1989)
 Ranma ½: Big Trouble in Nekonron, China (1991)
 Ranma ½: Nihao My Concubine (1992)
 Dohyō no Oni-tachi (1994)
 Ranma ½: Super Indiscriminate Decisive Battle! Team Ranma vs. the Legendary Phoenix (1994)
 You're Under Arrest: The Movie (1999)
 Mon Colle Knights the Movie: The Legendary Fire Dragon and The Mysterious Tatari-chan (2000)
 Initial D Third Stage (2001, with Pastel)
 Fate/Stay Night: Unlimited Blade Works (2010)
 Hetalia: Axis Powers - Paint it, White! (2010)
 Hakuoki: Wild Dance of Kyoto (2013)
 Hakuoki: Warrior Spirit of the Blue Sky (2014)
 The World's Greatest First Love: The Case of Takafumi Yokozawa (2014)
 The World’s Greatest First Love: Valentine Arc (2014)
 Ongaku Shōjo (2015)
 Meiji Tokyo Renka the Movie: Serenade of the Crescent Moon (2015)
 Meiji Tokyo Renka the Movie: Fantasia of the Flower Mirror (2016)
 Why We Live: The Priest Rennyo and the Yoshizaki Fire (2016)
 Ao Oni: The Animation (2017)
 The World’s Greatest First Love: Proposal Arc (2020)
 Pretty Guardian Sailor Moon Eternal The Movie (2021, with Toei Animation)
 The Seven Deadly Sins: Cursed by Light (2021)
 Pretty Guardian Sailor Moon Cosmos The Movie (2023, with Toei Animation)
 Sasaki and Miyano: Sotsugyō-hen (2023)
 Gekijōban Collar × Malice Deep Cover (2023)

References

 Nakagami, Yoshikatsu et al. "You're Under Arrest: Full Throttle". (December 2007) Newtype USA. pp. 48–49.

External links 

 
 
 
 
 

 
Japanese animation studios
Mass media companies established in 1975
Japanese companies established in 1975
Animation studios in Tokyo